Vladislav Gerasimenko (born 26 April 2001) is a Russian competitive swimmer. He is a world junior record holder in the long course 4×100 metre medley relay, swimming a 59.53 for the breaststroke portion of the relay. He is a four-time medalist at the 2018 Summer Youth Olympics and a five-time medalist at the World Junior Swimming Championships, spanning breaststroke and freestyle disciplines. He competed at the 2021 European Short Course Swimming Championships, placing sixteenth in the preliminaries of the 50 metre breaststroke.

Background
Gerasimenko was born 26 April 2001 in Russia.

Career

2017

As a 16-year-old competing at the 2017 European Youth Summer Olympic Festival in Győr, Hungary in July, Gerasimenko won the gold medal in the 100 metre breaststroke with a time of 1:02.20, placed sixth in the 200 metre breaststroke at 2:19.29, and won gold medals as part of both the 4×100 metre medley relay and 4×100 metre mixed medley relay swimming the breaststroke leg of the relays in the final. At the 2017 World Junior Swimming Championships held at the Indiana University Natatorium in Indianapolis, United States in August, he placed 5th in the 50 metre breaststroke with a 27.82, 13th in the 100 metre breastroke with a 1:02.14, won a gold medal in the 4×100 metre medley relay for his prelims relay contribution swimming the breaststroke leg in 1:01.51, and won a bronze medal as part of the 4×100 metre mixed medley relay contributing a split of 1:01.77 for the breaststroke leg in the prelims.

2018

2018 European Junior Championships
In July 2018, Gerasimenko won the gold medal in the 50 metre breaststroke with a time of 28.03 seconds at the 2018 European Junior Swimming Championships in Helsinki, Finland. For the his second individual event, he won the gold medal in the 100 metre breaststroke with a time of 1:01.36. He also won gold medals in the 4×100 metre medley relay, with a final relay time of 3:35.58, and the 4×100 metre mixed medley relay, in a Championships record and European junior record time of 3:47.99, swimming breaststroke in the final for each relay.

2018 Summer Youth Olympics

A few months later, in October 2018 at the 2018 Summer Youth Olympics in Buenos Aires, Argentina, Gerasimenko won his first gold medal of the competition on the first day in the 4×100 metre mixed freestyle relay, finals relay time of 3:28.50, for his contributions in the prelims heats and placed seventh in the final of the 100 metre breaststroke the following day with a time of 1:02.43. The third day of competition, Gerasimenko split a 51.56 for the third leg of the 4×100 metre freestyle relay to help win the gold medal with fellow finals relay teammates Kliment Kolesnikov, Daniil Markov, and Andrey Minakov in a time of 3:18.11. In the final of the 4×100 metre medley relay the following day, he split a 1:01.50 for the breaststroke leg of the relay to contribute to a gold medal win in a world junior record time of 3:35.17. On the sixth and final day of competition, he swam breaststroke in the prelims heats of the 4×100 metre mixed medley relay, winning a silver medal for his efforts when the relay placed second with a 3:51.46 in the final, and placed sixth in the final of the 50 metre breaststroke, his final individual event of the competition, with a time of 28.36 seconds.

2019

2019 European Junior Championships
For the 50 metre breaststroke at the 2019 European Junior Swimming Championships, held at the Palace of Water Sports in Kazan in July, Gerasimenko won the gold medal with a time of 27.89 seconds. In the final of the 100 metre breaststroke, he tied for third place with a time of 1:00.84. He also won a gold medal as part of the 4×100 metre medley relay, swimming the breaststroke leg of the relay in the prelims heats with a time of 1:03.76.

2019 World Junior Championships

On the second day of the 2019 World Junior Swimming Championships, held at Danube Arena in Budapest, Hungary in August, Gerasimenko won the gold medal in the 100 metre breaststroke with a time of 59.97 seconds, finishing 0.20 seconds ahead of silver medalist in the event Josh Matheny of the United States. His time set a new Russian national age group record for boys aged 18 years old and younger and broke the former record of 1:00.12 set in 2015 by Anton Chupkov, it also made him the eighth-fastest male Russian swimmer in the event in history. The sixth and final day of competition, he won the gold medal in the 50 metre breaststroke with a time of 27.58 seconds. Later in the same session, he won a gold medal in the 4×100 metre medley relay, helping set a new world record and Championships record of 3:33.19 with relay teammates Nikolay Zuev, Andrey Minakov, and Aleksandr Shchegolev by swimming the breaststroke 100 metre portion of the relay in 59.53 seconds.

2021
In October 2021, Gerasimenko competed at the fourth stop of the 2021 Swimming World Cup, held in Kazan and conducted in short course metres, placing 16th in his first event, the 100 metre breaststroke, with a time of 59.76 seconds. The next day he swam a 27.39 to place 17th in the 50 metre breaststroke. For the third and final day of competition, he swam a personal best time of 2:16.43 in the 200 metre breaststroke prelims heats and placing 18th overall. Following the Swimming World Cup, Gerasimenko competed at his first senior international championships, the 2021 European Short Course Swimming Championships in Kazan in November, where he placed 16th in the prelims heats of the 50 metre breaststroke and did not advance to the semifinals as he was the fourth-fastest Russian swimmer in the prelims heats with his time of 26.80 seconds and only the fastest two were eligible to advance.

2022: Two different-scale bans for his nationality
Gerasimenko was declared not welcome at European swimming competitions organized by LEN as part of a ban applied to all Russian and Belarusian nationals starting 3 March 2022, effective immediately, and continuing indefinitely. He was further banned from world competitions organized by FINA on 21 April 2022, part of a similar dissent propagated by FINA against all Russians and Belarusians in the form of excluding nationals from those countries at their events for at least the period of time lasting through 31 December 2022. For the rest of the 2022 year, his and other Russians's times were not counted towards world rankings nor world records regardless of the competition they were achieved at.

International championships

 Gerasimenko swam only in the prelims heats.

Personal best times

Long course metres (50 m pool)

Short course metres (25 m pool)

Legend: h – prelims heat

Records

World junior records

Long course metres (50 m pool)

References

External links
 

2001 births
Living people
Russian male breaststroke swimmers
Russian male freestyle swimmers
Swimmers at the 2018 Summer Youth Olympics
Youth Olympic gold medalists for Russia
21st-century Russian people